Jonathan Tulloch is a British author, naturalist, and former teacher who writes regular nature features for The Times and The Tablet. His 2000 novel The Season Ticket was adapted into the film Purely Belter and serialised on BBC Radio 4. Tulloch's books have received reviews from "wholly absorbing" to "a pitch-perfect realisation of the bleak mundanity of daily life".

He was born in Cumbria, and has also lived in Gateshead, South Africa and Bagby.

Tulloch was Green Party candidate in Stillington Ward for the 2013 North Yorkshire County Council election. He came second with 17% of the vote.

Awards

2000, Betty Trask Award for The Season Ticket
2003, J.B. Priestley Award for The Lottery
2009, K. Blundell Award for The Lottery

Books

The Season Ticket (2000, adults)
The Bonny Lad (2002, adults)
The Lottery (2004, adults)
I Am A Cloud, I Can Blow Anywhere (2007, children)
Give Us This Day (2007, adults)
A Winding Road (2011, adults)
Mr McCool (2012, children)
Larkinland (2017, adults)
Cuckoo Summer (2022, children)

References 

British writers
Living people
British male writers
21st-century British writers
English male novelists
English children's writers
British nature writers
Year of birth missing (living people)